The 3rd constituency of Somme is a French legislative constituency in the Somme département. Like the other 576 French constituencies, it elects one MP using the two-round system, with a run-off if no candidate receives over 50% of the vote in the first round.

Description

The 3rd constituency of the Somme stretches along the entire length of the department's coast as well as reaching into its centre close to Amiens.

The seat is extremely marginal and has swung between left and right throughout the Fifth Republic.

Historic Representation

Election results

2022

 
 
 
|-
| colspan="8" bgcolor="#E9E9E9"|
|-

2017

2012

2007

 
 
 
 
 
 
|-
| colspan="8" bgcolor="#E9E9E9"|
|-

2002

 
 
 
 
 
|-
| colspan="8" bgcolor="#E9E9E9"|
|-

1997

 
 
 
 
 
 
|-
| colspan="8" bgcolor="#E9E9E9"|
|-

Sources
 Official results of French elections from 2002: "Résultats électoraux officiels en France" (in French).
 Official results of French elections from 2012: "ACCUEIL > SOMME (80) > 3èmecirconscription" (in French).
 Official results of French elections from 2017: "ACCUEIL > SOMME (80) > 3èmecirconscription" (in French).

3